Fimbles is a British children's television series created and produced by Novel Entertainment. The series has 200 episodes, airing from 2002 to 2004 with repeats airing until early 2012 on CBeebies. The Fimbles are Fimbo, Florrie and Baby Pom, three magical characters who all live in a bright, lush, and colourful place called Fimble Valley. The production of the show itself was filmed at Bray Studios in Berkshire.

The programme has been broadcast in over 100 countries, including Canada, China and all the countries in mainland Europe.

About
The series features three magical hippo/pig/tapir-like hybrid creatures called the "Fimbles", who are portrayed by "skin" actors in complex, fluffy animatronic suits and all look quite similar apart from their colour and size. The characters explore Fimble Valley and can find things through a special "sixth sense". When the Tinkling Tree tinkles its bell-like blossoms, it makes the nose, fingers and topknot of one or more Fimbles twitch as they get the "Fimbling Feeling". This tells the character(s) that they are going to find something. It may be a natural phenomenon - a patch of sunlight for example, an everyday object, e.g. a tambourine, or something which would be totally inexplicable in the real world, such as a puddle of blue "galoo". Whatever is found becomes the catalyst for the episode's adventures and the trigger for the Fimbles' creative play. The other characters featured are large-scale puppets who normally help out the Fimbles with something.

The snouted and concentrically-ringed appearance of the Fimbles was based on the eponymous villains of Lucy Anna and the Finders, written and illustrated by Sarah Hayes. Although Hayes is cited in the credits of Fimbles, and she was involved in adapting the characters for the television series, the implacably omnivorous Finders (who, throughout the book, threaten to eat Lucy Anna) have nothing else in common with the Fimbles.

Characters
 Fimbo - A yellow Fimble with green stripes. Fimbo is the oldest, tallest and only male of the trio. He likes to play his Shimmi Shaker and eat crumble crackers. He is operated by John Tobias, Steve Poole and Adam Blaug and voiced by Aidan Cook.
 Florrie - A blue Fimble with purple stripes. She likes to sing songs and is normally seen with a doll that resembles a Fimble called "Little One". She is operated by Jenny Hutchinson, Leah Green and Holli Hoffman and voiced by Shelley Longworth (Season 1) and Kate Harbour (Season 2).
 Baby Pom - A green Fimble with pink stripes. Being the youngest and smallest, she has a personality similar to that of a toddler. She generally follows the other Fimbles around their world and normally pushes a yellow wagon called the "Trundle Truck". She is operated by Samantha Dodd and Denise Dove and voiced by Tamsin Heatley.
 Roly Mo - A purple and green striped mole. He has a huge underground library, where he finds a book to show off to the Fimbles in every episode. He is puppeteered by Neil Sterenberg and Iestyn Evans (assistant) and voiced by Wayne Forester.
 Rockit - A blue tree frog who is normally seen hopping around and being quite inquisitive and energetic. He is puppeteered by Simon Buckley and Katherine Smee and voiced by Wayne Forester.
 Bessie - A plump pink bird who lives near the waterfall with Ribble. She normally gives out a summary at the end of the programme of what the Fimbles did in the episode. The episode, "Yodelling Echo", reveals she knows how to yodel. She is puppeteered by Neil Sterenberg, Steven Kynman and Robert Skidmore (assistant) and voiced by Tamsin Heatley.
 Ribble - An orange male fluffball chick with a light blue beak who is Bessie's son. He makes squeaks that the other characters can understand. He was given black eyes in later episodes. He is operated by Garry Rutter, Dan Carlisle and Matthew Lyons and voiced by Tamsin Heatley.

Episodes

Related material and spin-offs
In 2004, The Roly Mo Show began airing on CBeebies. As with the original show, this series was also produced by Novel Entertainment and stars Roly Mo and a cast of other characters including Roly's niece Little Bo. The Roly Mo Show concentrates on literacy and books and is made as an educational programme.

Fimbly Songtime, a shortened version of the programme featuring only the songs, has also aired in the past. The programme has also erroneously been listed as Fimbles Songtime.

A radio series titled RockIt's Pocket, featuring the Rockit character, aired on the long-gone CBeebies Radio strand on BBC Radio 7 (now BBC Radio 4 Extra) in 2009.

Horrid Henry, another Novel Entertainment program, has referenced the show and characters frequently throughout the series.

A live touring show produced by BBC Worldwide titled Fimbles Live! - It's A Party toured theatres across the United Kingdom from April–November 2006 and was devised by the playwright and author David Wood CBE. The show focused on the characters planning a party, with CBeebies presenter Sarah-Jane Honeywell as the special guest, being the first human to visit Fimble Valley.

International airings
In the Republic of Ireland, Fimbles was broadcast on Network 2 (later changed to RTÉ2 in 2004) as part of a lineup of programmes for younger children called The Den and it started airing on 20 January 2003.

In Australia from 3 February 2003 to 30 September 2008, Fimbles was broadcast on ABC and its third digital channel ABC2.

Fimbles (핌블핌블) has been extremely popular in South Korea, where KBS 2TV broadcast the programme under a partnership with the BBC from 23 June 2003 to 29 October 2004. Yoo Sang-won directed the Korean dub, which led the show to become well-known and liked among Koreans at the time because of its both fun and educational aspects.

As of 1 June 2007 Fimbles (粉宝乐园) is being broadcast in China on Shanghai Media Group's children's network HAHA TV. All 200 episodes are being shown sequentially and dubbed in Mandarin Chinese. As the show in its original format is only 19 minutes long, the show has been lengthened by 5 minutes for the Chinese market.

In Vietnam, since 2008, Fimbles is a part of the show 5 Minutes to Learn English Everyday (5 phút học [tiếng Anh] mỗi ngày), which is produced by HTV4 together with many famous English centres and international schools. However, in VBC, it is a separate show named Những chú heo con Fimbles.

Since June 2008, the show has also been broadcast by Tata Sky DTH in India under a partnership with the BBC on the country's variant of the CBeebies channel.

In Colombia from 2004 and 2007, it was broadcast by Señal Colombia.

In New Zealand, the show was played on TV2.

In South Africa, Fimbles began airing on SABC 1.

In Singapore, it was broadcast by Central and played on their children's block Kids Central. The series aired in Singapore from 2003 to January 2006 and then on Okto in 2011.

In Hong Kong, the series was screened on TVB Pearl.

In Malta, Fimbles was aired on TVM.

In Thailand, the English version of the series was broadcast on Thai cable television TrueVisions (originally known as UBC at the time) on their children's network UBC Spark.

The show has aired on Bang Bang in Albania under the title "Fimbëllsat", with re-runs continuing to air as recently as 2012. It is dubbed in Albanian.

In Israel, Fimbles has been broadcast in Hebrew on the Hop! Channel, One of the voice artists of that dub is Ami Mandelman who also voiced Bert on Rechov Sumsum, and Goofy from The Mickey Mouse Series.

Award nominations
 BAFTA Children's Awards 2003
 Nominated for Best Pre-school Live Action Series
 BAFTA Children's Awards 2004
 Nominated for Best Pre-school Live Action Series

Awards

See also
 Teletubbies
 Boohbah
 Tweenies
 In The Night Garden...

References

External links
 
 
 (The Filmbles: Teletubbies II) on https://www.independent.co.uk/news/media/the-fimbles-teletubbies-ii-173209.html
 Novel Entertainment - Novel Website (http://novelentertainment.co.uk/productions/fimbles/)

2000s British children's television series
2000s preschool education television series
2002 British television series debuts
2004 British television series endings
British parody television series
Australian Broadcasting Corporation original programming
BBC children's television shows
British preschool education television series
Television series about children
British television shows featuring puppetry
CBeebies
English-language television shows
Fictional proboscideans
Fictional trios